Foodini the Great is an early CBS children's television series. A 15-minute puppet show, it was performed live at 6:30 p.m. Monday to Friday from August 23, 1948, to June 23, 1951.

The show was originally titled The Adventures of Lucky Pup, but Foodini the magician and his assistant Pinhead proved to
be so popular the show was renamed.

There were Foodini comic books from Holyoke Publishing, as well as records, greeting cards, toys, and magic sets. The comic books are named The Great Foodini, Adventures of Foodini the Great, and Pinhead and Foodini.

The UCLA Film and Television Archive holds several kinescope recordings of this series, including a few episodes from 1948.

External links

 The Great Foodini (fan site)
 S. Berliner, III's Pinhead and Foodini Page (fan site)
 Pinhead and Foodini at the Paley Center for Media

1948 American television series debuts
1951 American television series endings
1940s American children's television series
1950s American children's television series
American television shows featuring puppetry
American live television series
Black-and-white American television shows
CBS original programming